"The Seven Ravens" (German: Die sieben Raben) is a German fairy tale collected by the Brothers Grimm (KHM 25). It is of Aarne–Thompson type 451 ("The Maiden Who Seeks Her Brothers"), commonly found throughout Europe.

Georgios A Megas collected another, Greek variant in Folktales of Greece. Other variants of the Aarne–Thompson type include The Six Swans, The Twelve Wild Ducks, Udea and her Seven Brothers, The Wild Swans, and The Twelve Brothers.

An animated feature film based on the story was released in 1937 (see The Seven Ravens).

Origin 
The tale was published by the Brothers Grimm in the first edition of the Kinder- und Hausmärchen in 1812, under the name "Die drei Raben" (The Three Ravens). In the second edition, in 1819, the name was retitled Die sieben Raben and substantially rewritten. Their source was the Hassenpflug family, and others.

Synopsis

A peasant has seven sons and no daughter. Finally a daughter is born, but is sickly. The father sends his sons to fetch water for her, in the German version to be baptized, in the Greek version to take water from a healing spring. In their haste, they drop the jug in the well. When they do not return, their father thinks that they have gone off to play and curses them and so they turn into ravens.

When the sister is grown, she sets out in search of her brothers. She attempts to get help first from the sun, which is too hot, then the moon, which craves human flesh, and then the morning star. The star helps her by giving her a chicken bone (in the German) or a bat's foot (in the Greek) and tells her she will need it to save her brothers. She finds them on the Glass Mountain. In the Greek version, she opens it with the bat's foot, in the German, she has lost the bone, and chops off a finger to use as a key, (or she opens it with chicken bone). She goes into the mountain, where a dwarf tells her that her brothers will return. She takes some of their food and drink and leaves, in the last cup, a ring from home.

When her brothers return, she hides. They turn back into human form and ask who has been at their food. The youngest brother finds the ring, and hopes it is their sister, in which case they are saved. She emerges, and they return home.

Analysis

This tale, like The Twelve Brothers, The Six Swans, and Brother and Sister, features a woman rescuing her brothers. In the era and region in which it was collected, many men were drafted by kings for soldiers, to be sent as mercenaries. As a consequence, many men made their daughters their heirs; however, they also exerted more control over them and their marriages. The stories have been interpreted as a wish by women for the return of their brothers, freeing them from this control. However, the issues of when the stories were collected are unclear, and stories of this type have been found in many other cultures, where this issue can not have inspired them.

Some folklorists connect this tale to the more general practice of ultimogeniture, in which the youngest child would inherit.

Commentary
In the original oral version, there were three, not seven ravens; one study of German folk tales found that of 31 variants collected after the publication of Grimms' Fairy Tales, only two followed the Grimms in having seven ravens.

A Polish variant exists with the name The Seven Raven Brothers, collected from the Płock region.

Two Slovakian versions exist: one named O sklenenom zámku ("About the glass keyhole"), archived in the Slovak collection named Codexy Revúcke ("Codices of Revúca"), and published version Traja zhavranení bratia ("Three Raven Brothers").

A Puerto Rican variant exists with the title of "The Seven Crows."

In music

The Liechtenstein composer Josef Rheinberger based an opera on the tale, which was premiered in 1867. Ludwig Englander wrote a romantic fairy tale in four acts called The Seven Ravens, combining drama, pantomime, opera and ballet. The libretto was by C. Lehnhardt and based on the original German play by Emil Pohl. It was translated by G.P. Lathorp and ran at Niblo's Gardens, New York, from 8 November 1884 for a total of 96 performances. A competing spectacle by the Kiralfy Brothers, Sieba and the Seven Ravens, was presented at the Star Theatre.

The German pagan folk band Faun released in 2019 a song called Sieben Raben (from the album 
Märchen & Mythen), inspired by this fairy tale.

Modern interpretations
Black Feather by K. Tempest Bradford (published in the Interfictions anthology, 2007) references commonalities between The Six Swans, The Seven Ravens, and The Twelve Brothers while building a new narrative for the sister character found in all three versions.

A musical version of The Seven Ravens, written by Wolfgang Adenberg and Alexander S. Bermange was presented at the Amphitheater Park Schloss Philippsruhe, Hanau, Germany as part of the Brothers Grimm Festival in 2007.

A fantasy webcomic named Raven Saga, created by Chiriro Howe and published by Webtoon.

See also

 Raven Tales
 The Raven (Brothers Grimm)

References

External links

 

Grimms' Fairy Tales
Fiction about shapeshifting
Fictional birds
ATU 400-459
7 (number)